Margrit Thommen is a Swiss orienteering competitor and European champion. She won the gold medal in the individual event at the 1964 European Orienteering Championships, and also a silver medal in the relay event.

References

Year of birth missing (living people)
Living people
Swiss orienteers
Female orienteers
Foot orienteers